Yoruba music is the pattern/style of music practiced by the Yoruba people of Nigeria, Togo, and Benin. It is perhaps best known for its extremely advanced drumming tradition and techniques, especially using the gongon hourglass shape tension drums. Yoruba folk music became perhaps the most prominent kind of West African music in Afro-Latin and Caribbean musical styles; it left an especially important influence on the music used in Santería practice and the music of Cuba.

The Yoruba people of south-western Nigeria are also one of the most socially diverse groups on the African continent. A major feature that sets them apart from other groups in Nigeria is their accomplishment in the arts and entertainment industry, especially in music. Jùjú, fùjì, àpàlà and sákárà music are among the popular genres of music that originated among the Yoruba people. How and when these forms of music emerged in the Nigerian music scene has remained a puzzle to historians. However, it is generally believed that these genres of music originated from popular folk music among the Yoruba people during the colonial era and gradually grew to become popular forms of music in the country after independence in 1960. This paper traces the origin and the significance of Yoruba traditional music in Nigeria as well as its roles in popularising the cultural values and heritage of the Yoruba people at home and in the diaspora. It is argued that music constitutes an important medium through which Yoruba values have been sustained in society in the face of the aggressive cultural imperialism that is fast encroaching the African continent. For a comprehensive discussion of Yoruba music, see Bode Omojola's book, Yoruba Music in the Twentieth Century (University of Rochester Press, 2012).

Folk music
Ensembles using the dundun play a type of music that is also called dundun. These ensembles consist of various sizes of tension drums along with special band drums (ogido). The gangan is another such. The leader of a dundun ensemble is the oniyalu who uses the drum to "talk" by imitating the tonality of Yoruba. Much of Yoruba music is spiritual in nature, and this form is often devoted to Orisas.

Rhythmic structure

The most commonly used key pattern, or guide pattern in traditional Yoruba drumming is the seven-stroke figure known in ethnomusicology as the standard pattern. The standard pattern is expressed in both a triple-pulse (12/8 or 6/8) and a duple-pulse (4/4 or 2/2) structure. The standard pattern is often sounded on an iron bell.

The strokes of the standard pattern coincide with: 1,  1a,  2& 2a,  3&,  4, 4a.

12/8:
 1 & a 2 & a 3 & a 4 & a ||
 X . X . X X . X . X . X ||
4/4:
 1 e & a 2 e & a 3 e & a 4 e & a ||
 X . . X . . X X . . X . X . . X ||

A great deal of Yoruba drum music is based in cross rhythm. The following example shows the five-stroke form of the standard pattern (known as clave
in Afro-Latin music) on the kagano dundun drum (top line). The dunduns on the second and third lines sound an embellishment of the three-over-four (3:4) cross-rhythm—expressed as three pairs of strokes against four pairs of strokes.

Popular music
Yorùbá music is regarded as one of the more important components of the modern Nigerian popular music scene. Although traditional Yoruba music was not influenced by foreign music the same cannot be said of modern-day Yoruba music which has evolved and adapted itself through contact with foreign instruments, talents and creativity. Interpretation involves rendering African, here Yoruba, musical expression using a mixture of instruments from different horizons.

Yoruba music traditionally centred on folklore and spiritual/deity worship, utilising basic and natural instruments such as clapping of the hands. Playing music for a living was not something the Yorubas did and singers were referred to in a derogatory term of Alagbe, it is this derogation of musicians that made it not appeal to modern Yoruba at the time. Although, it is true that music genres like the highlife played by musicians like Rex Lawson, Ebenezer Obey Segun Bucknor, Bobby Benson, etc., Fela Kuti's Afrobeat and King Sunny Adé's jùjú are all Yoruba adaptations of foreign music. These musical genres have their roots in large metropolitan cities like Lagos, Ibadan, and Port Harcourt where people and culture mix influenced by their rich culture.

Some pioneering Jùjú musicians include Tunde King, Tunde Nightingale, Why Worry in Ondo and Ayinde Bakare,Dr. Orlando Owoh, Dele Ojo, Ik Dairo Moses Olaiya (Baba Sala). sakara played by the pioneers such as Ojo Olawale in Ibadan, Abibu Oluwa, Yusuf Olatunji, Sanusi Aka, Saka Layigbade.

Apala, is another genre of Yoruba modern music which was played by spirited pacesetters such as Haruna Ishola, Sefiu Ayan, Ligali Mukaiba, Kasumu Adio, Yekini (Y.K.) Ajadi, etc.

Fuji, which emerged in the late 60s/early 70s, as an offshoot of were/ajisari music genres, which were made popular by certain Ibadan singers/musicians such as the late Sikiru Ayinde Barrister, Alhaji Dauda Epo-Akara and Ganiyu Kuti or "Gani Irefin.

Another popular genre is waka music played and popularized by Alhaja Batile Alake and, more recently, Salawa Abeni, Kuburat Alaragbo, Asanat Omo-Aje, Mujidat Ogunfalu, Misitura Akawe, Fatimo Akingbade, Karimot Aduke, and Risikat Abeawo. In both Ibadan (Nigeria's largest city), and Lagos (Nigeria's most populous city), these multicultural traditions were brought together and became the root of Nigerian popular music.

Musical instruments
 Agbe: a shaker
 Ashiko: a cone-shaped drum
 Batá drum: a well decorated traditional drum of many tones, with strong links to the deity Shango, it produces sharp high tone sounds.
 Goje: sort of violin like the sahelian kora
 Sekere: a melodic shaker; beads or cowrie shells beautifully wound around a gourd, shaken, beaten by fists occasionally and thrown in the air to create a festive mood.
 gudugudu: a smaller, melodic bata
 Sakara drum: goatskin istretched over clay ring
 Agogô: a high-pitched tone instrument like a "covered" 3-dimensional "tuning fork"
 Saworo: like agogo, but its tone is low-pitched
 aro: much like a saworo, low-pitched
 Seli: a combination of aro, saworo and hand-clapping
 Agidigbo, a thumb piano instrument wound round the neck and stabilized by the player's chest.
 Dundun, consisting of iya ilu or gbedu, main or "mother" drum and omele, smaller drums, played as an accompaniment to bata drums to create a base for their sharp beats.
 Bembé, bass drum, kettle drum. (see also List of Caribbean membranophones)
Gangan: a talking drum, has two face and use in prosody if human speech
Omele Ako Bata: known as omele meta and is a smallest drums in bata family
Ahmad Audi Adamu

See also
List of Nigerian highlife musicians

References

 
Music